Greenleaf Book Group is an independent book publisher and distributor, which was established by Clint Greenleaf in 1997. Greenleaf was a CPA and accountant at Deloitte & Touche before writing his first book, Attention to Detail, in 1997 and then founding the company over his parents’ garage. The company is based on a business model where the author pays for the publishing under a selective imprint and retains all rights. It has been based in Austin, Texas, United States of America since 2004.

Clint Greenleaf moved to Chairman and Tanya Hall was appointed CEO in January 2014. Clint Greenleaf stepped down as Chairman in 2015 in order to focus on a new business startup, Home Plate Peanut Butter.

See also
List of publishers
List of book distributors
Publishing

References

External links 
 

Companies based in Austin, Texas
Book publishing companies based in Texas
Publishing companies established in 1997